San Bartolomé Perulapía is a municipality in the Cuscatlán department of El Salvador. It is located on the highway between San Martín and Suchitoto.

The following statistics are for a city of the same name within the municipality:

Municipality statistics 
Population: 12,000 (according to mayorship) or 6909 (according to SIBASI 2001)
One Hospital
Two Schools
Ten Churches
Water, electricity, phone services
Two Alcoholics Anonymous groups
A police force
A court

History 
When the Spanish conquistadors came, the location was part of three native towns called pupulapan. The towns were then called, by the Europeans, San Martín, San Pedro, y San Bartolomé Perulapán, also called pupulapía, y transformed into perulapía. In 1770 Pedro Cortés y Larraz estimated that the population was 421 natives and 6 Latinos in population.

It was part of the department of San Salvador from 1824 until 1835, at which time it was turned over to Cuscatlán. Because of an earthquake in 1872, the town was moved a kilometer from its original location. Its population was 960 inhabitants in 1890.

External links 
http://www.gobernacion.gob.sv/observatorio/Iniciativas%20Locales/WEB/Cuscatl%C3%A1n/snbartolomeperulapia.htm Information

Municipalities of the Cuscatlán Department